The P-120 Malakhit ( 'Malachite'; NATO reporting name: SS-N-9 Siren, GRAU designation: 4K85) is a Russian medium range anti-ship missile used by corvettes and submarines. Introduced in 1972, it remains in service but has been superseded by the P-270 Moskit.

Development
The  was required to spend 30 minutes or more on the surface when firing its P-5 Pyatyorka (SS-N-3A 'Shaddock') missiles. This made the submarines very vulnerable to enemy attack, so in 1963 the Soviets started work on a new missile that could be fired whilst submerged, and a submarine to carry it. The P-50 was replaced by the P-120 design during development.

However, problems in development meant that the twelve Charlie I submarines were built with the shorter-ranged P-70 Ametist (SS-N-7 'Starbright', an evolution of the SS-N-2C 'Styx') as a stopgap before the introduction of the P-120 Malakhit on the Charlie II.

The P-120 missile was later used as the basis for the SS-N-14 Silex rocket-propelled torpedo.

Design
The L band seeker and radar altimeter originally designed for the 'Siren' were first used on the 'Starbright' whilst the Soviets sorted out the P-120's troublesome engines. However the 'Siren' has space for datalink equipment, allowing mid-course guidance from the launch platform or something else.  When fired from a submarine, the missile can be launched at a maximum depth of 50 meters.

Operational history
The 'Siren' entered service on corvettes of the Soviet Navy on March 17, 1972. It would be installed on Nanuchka-class corvettes. About 500 missiles were produced.

It was not until November 1977 that it was accepted for use on submarines. The Charlie-II submarine carried eight missiles (of which two usually carried thermonuclear warheads).

It saw action in 2008 in the hands of the Black Sea Fleet of the Russian Navy during the action off Abkhazia, where it was used 
without success, mistakenly against MV Lotos-1 from Moldova.

Operators

Russian Navy

References

External links
MARITIME STRIKE The Soviet Perspective
www.dtig.org Russian/Sovjet Sea-based Anti-Ship Missiles (pdf)

Cold War anti-ship cruise missiles of the Soviet Union
P-120
P-120
Cruise missiles of the Cold War
Nuclear missiles of the Cold War
P-120
Surface-to-surface missiles
Cruise missiles of Russia
Nuclear cruise missiles of Russia
Submarine-launched cruise missiles of Russia
NPO Mashinostroyeniya products
Military equipment introduced in the 1970s